Tepeyac is a 1917 film directed by José Manuel Ramos,  Carlos E. Gonzáles and  Fernando Sáyago rescued by Aurelio de los Reyes and restored by National Autonomous University of Mexico.

Plot
Lupita Flores knows her fiancé Carlos Fernández was in a boat sunk by a German submarine and she prays to the Virgin of Guadalupe.

Later on, she cannot sleep and she starts reading a book about the apparition of Tonantzin as the Virgin of Guadalupe. The story follows Juan Diego, who sees a vision of the maiden at Tepeyac. Eventually, Carlos is saved and Lupita and Carlos go to Basilica of Our Lady of Guadalupe on December 12.

References

Bibliography 
 David E. Wilt: The Mexican Filmography 1916 through 2001. McFarland & Co Inc, Jefferson NC 2004. 
Rodrãguez, Paul A. Schroeder. “Latin American Silent Cinema: Triangulation and the Politics of Criollo Aesthetics.” Latin American Research Review, vol. 43, no. 3, 2008, pp. 33–58. JSTOR [JSTOR], doi:10.1353/lar.0.0049.

External links

  Página para ver la película en la Filmoteca de la UNAM filmoteca.unam.mx

1917 films
1917 drama films
Mexican silent films
Mexican black-and-white films
Films set in Mexico City
Mexico in fiction
Mexican drama films
Silent drama films